Isabella Howland (1895–1974) was an American painter, sculptor, and caricaturist.

Born in Brookline, Massachusetts, Howland was associated with Maine for much her career; she also lived and worked in New York City. Several of her works are owned by the Whitney Museum of American Art, and she is also represented in the collection of the Ogunquit Museum of American Art. As a student at the School of the Museum of Fine Arts, Boston, she received a scholarship to work at the Art Students League of New York. Her papers are currently in the collection of the Archives of American Art. Ten of her caricatures of artists are owned by the National Portrait Gallery.

References

1895 births
1974 deaths
American women painters
American women sculptors
20th-century American painters
20th-century American sculptors
20th-century American women artists
American caricaturists
American women cartoonists
People from Brookline, Massachusetts
Painters from Massachusetts
Painters from Maine
School of the Museum of Fine Arts at Tufts alumni
Art Students League of New York alumni
Sculptors from New York (state)
Sculptors from Massachusetts
American cartoonists